Edge Grove School, simply Edge Grove, is a 3–13 mixed, private, day and boarding preparatory school in Aldenham, Watford, Hertfordshire, England. It was established in 1935 and set on 48 acres.

The boys and girls are organised into five houses: Hedgerows, Sarnesfield, Churchill, Stratton and Gills.

History 
Mr John Skey bought the land on which the current property in 1733 and built the main block of what now stands as the main house. This house was then sold by his sons to Mr Thomas Hake some time in the late 1780s. The American financier and banker John Pierpont Morgan bought the property in 1912 and rented it to Mr Richard Bennett. Bennett converted the house with around £90,000 leading to the house as it stands currently. When it came to settling his estate, Morgan arranged for the council to take the freehold, specifying it should be used as an independent school.

The current head master as of 2020 is Ben Evans and he will be replaced by Lisa McDonald in September 2020 who works at the British International School in New York City.

Facilities 
The school has a large sports hall, all-weather tennis/netball courts, an AstroTurf pitch, 9 acres of playing fields, indoor & outdoor cricket nets and a heated outdoor swimming pool.

In November 2019, it recently opened £3.6m lower school building for Years 3 and 4.

Headmasters 
 John Baugh: 1997–2002
 Jolyon Waterfield: 1985–1997

Notable alumni 
 Marcus Buckingham, award-winning author and motivational speaker
 Dominic Selwood, historian and author
 Dominic Treadwell-Collins, Television Producer
Mark Foster-Brown (1972–77) was awarded the Royal Victorian Order CVO in the 2019 New Year's Honours List for his work with The Wessex Trust. 
Lieutenant-Colonel Tony Streather (1936-1940) was a mountaineer of  the Himalayas during the so-called "the golden age" in the 1950s.

References

External links 
 

Preparatory schools in Hertfordshire
Educational institutions established in 1935
1935 establishments in England
Aldenham